The 2022 Men's Pan American Cup was the sixth edition of the Men's Pan American Cup, the quadrennial international men's field hockey championship of the Americas organised by the Pan American Hockey Federation.

It was planned to be held alongside the women's tournament from 7 to 22 August 2021 in Tacarigua, Trinidad and Tobago. However, following the postponement of the 2020 Summer Olympics to July and August 2021 because of the COVID-19 pandemic the tournament was rescheduled and on 4 September 2020 the hosts Trinidad and Tobago withdrew from hosting the tournament. In November 2020, Pan American Hockey Federation announced that the cup was going to be held from 20 to 30 January 2022 in Santiago, Chile.

Argentina were the defending champions, winning the 2017 edition. They defended their title as they won the tournament for the fourth time by defeating the hosts Chile 5–1 in the final. As finalists the two teams qualified for the 2023 FIH Hockey World Cup.

Qualification
The top six teams from the previous Pan American Cup, the host if not already qualified and the winner of the 2021 Pan American Challenge qualified for the tournament.

Peru withdrew before the tournament, due to several positive COVID-19 tests in their team.

Preliminary round
All times are local (UTC−4).

Pool A

Pool B

Classification round

Bracket

Cross-overs

Fifth and sixth place

Semi-finals

Third and fourth place

Final

Final standings

Awards

Goalscorers

Notes

See also
2022 Women's Pan American Cup

References

 
Men's Pan American Cup
Pan American Cup
Pan American Cup
International field hockey competitions hosted by Chile
Pan American Cup
Sports competitions in Santiago
2020s in Santiago, Chile
Pan American Cup
Pan American Cup